CARTA may refer to:
 Center for Academic Research and Training in Anthropogeny (CARTA), University of California, San Diego
 Charleston Area Regional Transportation Authority
 Chattanooga Area Regional Transportation Authority
 Continuous adaptive risk and trust assessment, an approach in information security

See also 
 Carta (disambiguation)